Issikiomartyria is a genus of small primitive metallic moths in the family Micropterigidae.

Species
Issikiomartyria akemiae Hashimoto, 2006
Issikiomartyria bisegmentata Hashimoto, 2006
Issikiomartyria distincta Hashimoto, 2006
Issikiomartyria nudata  (Issiki, 1953) 
Issikiomartyria plicata Hashimoto, 2006

Micropterigidae
Moth genera